Marcabamba District is one of ten districts of the province Paucar del Sara Sara in Peru.

References